Edward Neville Isdell (born 8 June 1943 in Downpatrick, Northern Ireland) is an Irish businessman, former chair and CEO of The Coca-Cola Company and currently president of the WWF.

Early life and career
Isdell moved to Zambia at the age of ten, and joined the Coca-Cola Company in 1966 with the local bottling company there. In 1972, he became general manager of Coca-Cola Bottling of Johannesburg, the largest Coca-Cola bottler in Africa. Isdell was named region manager for Australia in 1980, and in 1981 he became president of the bottling joint venture between The Coca-Cola Company and San Miguel Corporation in the Philippines, where he oversaw the turnaround and renewal of the Coca-Cola business in that key country.

Isdell moved to (Germany) as president of the Company's Central European Division in 1985. In 1989, he was elected senior vice president of the Company and appointed president of the Northeast Europe/Africa Group (renamed the Northeast Europe/Middle East Group in 1992) and led the Company's entry into new markets in India, the Middle East, Eastern Europe and the former Soviet Union. In 1995, he was named president of the Greater Europe Group.

From July 1998 to September 2000, Isdell served as chairman and CEO of Coca-Cola Beverages Plc in Great Britain, where he oversaw that company's merger with Hellenic Bottling to form the world's second largest Coca-Cola bottler at the time, Coca-Cola Hellenic Bottling Company (HBC). He retired as vice chairman of Coca-Cola HBC in December 2001. From January 2002 to May 2004, Isdell was an international consultant to The Coca-Cola Company and headed his own investment company in Barbados.

Isdell served as chairman of the board (2004–2009) and chief executive officer (2004–2008) of Coca-Cola.  While CEO of Coca-Cola in 2007, Isdell earned a total compensation of $21,648,740, which included a base salary of $1,612,500, a cash bonus of $6,649,500, stocks granted of $5,200,017, and options granted of $7,369,657.

Isdell is currently Interim President of the World Wildlife Fund's International Board of Trustees and serves on the board of a number of other charities. He has also served on a number of corporate boards including General Motors and British Telecom. He holds five honorary doctorates and is a recipient of the Clinton Foundation Global Citizen Award. He is based together with his business interests in Barbados.

Education
Isdell earned a bachelor's degree in Social Science from the University of Cape Town and graduated from the Harvard Business School program for Management Development. He was awarded an honorary doctorate degree from Georgia State University.

Legacy
In 2011, Isdell donated 1 million dollars to the rugby club of the University of Cape Town, of which he is an alumnus.

In 2013, Isdell acquired the CHQ Building for €10 million, inside of which in 2016 he funded and launched EPIC The Irish Emigration Museum.

References

External links

 Coca-Cola Profile
 Forbes Profile
 

|-

1944 births
Living people
American chief executives of food industry companies
American drink industry businesspeople
Businesspeople from Northern Ireland
Coca-Cola people
People from Downpatrick
University of Cape Town alumni
Harvard Business School alumni